Luís Pedro de Freitas Pinto Trabulo (born 22 August 1994), known as Pité, is a Portuguese professional footballer who plays for C.D. Mafra as a midfielder.

Club career

Beira-Mar
Born in the town of Esgueira, Aveiro District, Pité joined local S.C. Beira-Mar's youth system in 2005, aged 11. He made his debut with the first team on 27 July 2013, playing the full 90 minutes in a 1–0 away loss against Portimonense S.C. in the first round of the Portuguese League Cup. His maiden appearance in the Segunda Liga took place on 12 August, in a 2–3 home defeat to FC Porto B.

Pité scored his first goal as a senior on 2 October 2013, helping to a 3–2 win at C.D. Santa Clara. He missed only seven matches during the campaign, helping to a 12th-place finish amongst 22 teams.

Porto
On 1 July 2014, Pité signed for FC Porto, being assigned to the reserves also in the second division. He spent two seasons playing for them, split roughly between starting games and coming on as a substitute.

Tondela
On 15 July 2016, Pité was loaned to Primeira Liga club C.D. Tondela for the season. He made 15 appearances across all competitions as it finally avoided relegation, scoring once as consolation in a 1–2 home loss to F.C. Arouca on 8 January 2017.

Pité joined on a permanent basis on 7 June 2017, until 2020.

Arouca
Out of work since leaving Tondela, Pité found a new team on 13 January 2021, joining second-tier Arouca on an 18-month deal. He scored his first goals on the final day of the season on 22 May, ensuring a play-off place with two in a 3–1 home victory over G.D. Chaves; three days later he scored the opening goal against Rio Ave F.C. in a 3–0 win in the play-off first leg (5–0 aggregate).

International career
On 17 July 2016, Pité was called to the Portugal Olympic squad due to appear in the year's Summer Olympic Games, replacing Nuno Santos. He replaced Porto's Sérgio Oliveira midway through the second half of the group stage opener against Argentina, and scored the final 2–0 in the 84th minute following a blunder from goalkeeper Gerónimo Rulli.

Career statistics

Honours
Porto B
Segunda Liga: 2015–16

References

External links

1994 births
Living people
People from Aveiro, Portugal
Sportspeople from Aveiro District
Portuguese footballers
Association football midfielders
Primeira Liga players
Liga Portugal 2 players
S.C. Beira-Mar players
FC Porto B players
C.D. Tondela players
F.C. Arouca players
C.D. Mafra players
Footballers at the 2016 Summer Olympics
Olympic footballers of Portugal